The MBC Entertainment Awards is a Korean awards ceremony held annually and sponsored by MBC. The awards ceremony is held at the end of each year and lasts approximately 140 minutes, being broadcast in two parts on MBC.

Hosts

History of winners
Sources: From 2010 onward.

MBC Comedy Broadcasting Awards Grand Prize (1990-1994)

MBC Comedy Daesang (1995-2000)

MBC Entertainment Awards (2001 - present)

Best Program Award

Top Excellence Award

2001 – 2020

2021 – present

Excellence Award

2001 – 2021

2021 – present

New Star Award

Best Newcomer / Rookie Award

2001 – 2020

2021 – present

Ratings Award

PD's Award

Screenwriter of the Year Award

Best Entertainer Award

Best Teamwork Award

Best Couple Award

Special Award

Popularity Award

MC Award

Star of the Year Award

Entertainer of the Year Award

Global Trend Award

Multi-tainer Award

Achievement Award

Digital Content Award

Ratings

2001 – 2020

2021 – present

See also

 List of Asian television awards

References

External links

 2003 MBC Entertainment Awards 
 2004 MBC Entertainment Awards 
 2005 MBC Entertainment Awards 
 2006 MBC Entertainment Awards 
 2007 MBC Entertainment Awards 
 2008 MBC Entertainment Awards 
 2009 MBC Entertainment Awards 
 2010 MBC Entertainment Awards 
 2011 MBC Entertainment Awards 
 2012 MBC Entertainment Awards 
 2013 MBC Entertainment Awards 
 2014 MBC Entertainment Awards 
 2015 MBC Entertainment Awards 
 2016 MBC Entertainment Awards 
 2017 MBC Entertainment Awards 
 2018 MBC Entertainment Awards 
 2019 MBC Entertainment Awards 
 2020 MBC Entertainment Awards 
 2021 MBC Entertainment Awards  
 2022 MBC Entertainment Awards  (Current)

Entertainment Awards
South Korean television awards
Awards established in 1990
1990 establishments in South Korea
Annual events in South Korea
South Korea annual television specials